Tancred of Hauteville (born  1119, died 16 March between 1138 and 1140), the second son of King Roger II of Sicily and his first wife, Elvira of Castile, was the Prince of Bari and Taranto from 1132 to 1138.

He was named by his father to replace the rebellious Grimoald, Prince of Bari, in 1132. He was only about thirteen or fourteen years old at the time. When he grew to adulthood, he became, along with his brothers Roger, duke of Apulia, and Alfonso, prince of Capua, one of his father's chief men on the peninsula, while the king himself remained mostly in Sicily.

Tancred died young between 1138 and 1140. William, his other brother, inherited his estates and titles. An elegy for an unnamed "son of Roger the Frank, lord of Sicily" by the Sicilian poet Abū l-Ḍawʾ was likely about Tancred, since the son in question was a young man who had only just begun his martial career. It was possibly about his brother Alfonso.

Notes

Sources

1110s births
Italo-Normans
Sons of kings
12th-century deaths
Children of Roger II of Sicily